Layston is a former village and parish located about a kilometre north-east of Buntingford in Hertfordshire, England, at 51°57′50″N 0°00′45″E.

In 1931 the parish had a population of 724. On 1 April 1937 the parish was abolished and merged with Buntingford, part also went to form Hormead.

Its former church, St Bartholomew's, became derelict but is the subject of a restoration project. People connected with the church include:
 Thomas Crouch, who was baptised in St Bartholomew's in 1607
 Robert Wogdon (January 1734 – 28 March 1813), founder of the gunsmith firm Wogdon & Barton, who was buried in the chancel with his wife, who had died in 1805
 Rev. Jonathan Gilder and Mary Brazier, who were married there in 1759; their daughter Sarah, baptised there in 1767, became (posthumously) the maternal grandmother to New Zealand suffragette Catherine Fulton
 Claud Lovat Fraser (15 May 1890 – 18 June 1921), who was buried in the churchyard. 
 Joseph Ironmonger Snoxell (1743-1810) of Stanmore, Middlesex, married Martha Moore (1740-1785) in the church on 15 November 1763. He owned or leased farms in Great and Little Stanmore, and Hatch End, Middx; Hitchin and Watford, Herts; and Barton, Cambridgeshire. Husband and wife are buried next to the ruined church at Stanmore, where there are memorials to them. 

There is a state-funded primary school, Layston First CE School.

References

External links
 Layston Church website - history and restoration
 Church family history index

Villages in Hertfordshire
Former civil parishes in Hertfordshire
Buntingford